Leah Daniels (born December 25, 1987) is a Canadian country music singer and songwriter. She is an independent recording artist. Her self-titled debut was released in November 2011 and her debut single was released in February 2012. She released her first music video titled "Suspicious Minds" on November 2, 2011 on CMT, Canada.

Early life and education
Leah Daniels grew up on a small farm in Uxbridge, Ontario. Daniels was constantly surrounded by music and singing. She was introduced to music at an early age by a grandfather who taught her how to yodel and an uncle who schooled her in classic rock. She began to write songs at age 12 preferring music that incorporated a country pop music sound.

Daniels began performing as a young girl in choirs and singing competitions. Her first exposure to country music came at age 10 singing at the CNE Open Country singing contest. While attending school in Uxbridge, Ontario Leah began to perform in musicals. She performed roles as Eliza Doolittle in "My Fair Lady", Sandy in "Grease" and Anita in "West Side Story". Her first professional singing job was at a dinner theatre called, "Al Capone’s Birthday". Soon after this at age 18 Leah was hired to work as a singer/dancer in the shows "School of Rock" and "Twistin’ to the Sixties" at a theme park called Canada's Wonderland. Here Leah met and began to sing with the musicians who form her current band.

In 2005 Daniels studied musical theatre at Sheridan College and the following year she studied voice at Humber College. At this point in 2007 Leah left school to pursue her ambition of writing, recording and releasing her own original music. In 2008, she recorded and released her first 3-song Demo "No Escape". It was considered to be mostly pop/R&B but one song "Perfect World" stood out as almost having a country flavour. The positive feedback to "Perfect World" inspired Leah to focus on country music writing at this point.

Career
In 2010, Daniels began to perform regularly as a country artist. She won the Durham Region Music Award for Country Artist of the Year. She also performed at the Havelock Country Jamboree alongside such music legends as Dwight Yoakam and Tanya Tucker. She followed this with a September 2010 appearance in the New Artist Showcase at the 2010 CCMA Music Week.

She began to build a motivated fan base on Facebook, Twitter and YouTube recording several music videos and posting them. Leah also began to write and record her debut CD with friend, musician and producer Sam Ellis. Sam is known as a member of the Hunter Hayes Band. The recording was finished in mid-2011 and the first song/video, "Suspicious Minds" was released to CMT Canada and YouTube in November 2011.'Suspicious Minds" was a remake of the Elvis Presley classic song of the same title.

Leah made her debut TV appearance on March 3, 2012 on the CTV Saskatchewan Telemiracle broadcast.
Leah Daniels released her second song/video, "One Night" to CMT Canada and YouTube June 8, 2012.'

One song from her new CD, "Still" has been featured on the CMT (Canada) show "Unstable".

Other projects
Daniels performed with the tour act God Made Me Funky during 2008 and 2009. She still performs occasionally with them. Leah recorded on the group's 4th album "Welcome to Nufunktonia", released in 2009. In 2010 she performed and toured with a "Hannah Montana" tribute show. That same year she also appeared as a background vocalist for the Canadian Band, IllScarlett for their performance at the 2010 Winter Olympics.

Discography

Studio albums

Singles

Music videos

Other album appearances

Awards and nominations

References

External links
 
 Leah Daniels music video, "We Got Snow"

1987 births
Living people
People from Uxbridge, Ontario
Canadian women country singers
Canadian country singer-songwriters
20th-century Canadian multi-instrumentalists
Musicians from Ontario
21st-century Canadian multi-instrumentalists
20th-century Canadian guitarists
21st-century Canadian guitarists
Canadian country guitarists
Canadian pop guitarists
Canadian pop singers
20th-century Canadian pianists
21st-century Canadian pianists
Canadian pop pianists
Canadian women pianists
20th-century Canadian women singers
21st-century Canadian women singers
20th-century women guitarists
21st-century women guitarists
20th-century women pianists
21st-century women pianists